The 2019–20 Rutgers Scarlet Knights men's basketball team represented Rutgers University–New Brunswick during the 2019–20 NCAA Division I men's basketball season. The Scarlet Knights were led by fourth-year head coach Steve Pikiell and played their home games at the Louis Brown Athletic Center in Piscataway, New Jersey as sixth-year members of the Big Ten Conference. They finished the season 20–11 and 11–9 in Big Ten play to finish in a four-way tie for fifth place. Following the regular season, the Big Ten tournament and all subsequent postseason tournaments were canceled due to the ongoing COVID-19 pandemic, effectively ending the Knights's season.

In January 2020, Rutgers was nationally ranked for the first time since 1979.

Previous season
The Knights finished the 2018–19 season 14–17, 7–13 in Big Ten play to finish in a three-way tie for 10th place. In the Big Ten tournament, they lost in the first round to Nebraska.

Offseason

Coaching changes
In April 2019, assistant Jay Young was hired as the new head coach at Fairfield. Pikiell elevated senior advisor Steve Hayn to assistant coach as his replacement in May 2019.

Departures

Incoming transfers

2019 recruiting class

Roster

Schedule and results

|-
!colspan=9 style=|Regular season

|-
!colspan=9 style=|Big Ten tournament

Source

Rankings

*AP does not release post-NCAA Tournament rankings

References

Rutgers Scarlet Knights men's basketball seasons
Rutgers
Rutgers
Rutgers